Kateřina Minařík Kudějová (née Kudějová, born 17 January 1990) is a Czech slalom canoeist who has competed at the international level since 2005.

She won six medals at the ICF Canoe Slalom World Championships with three golds (K1: 2015; K1 team: 2013, 2015) and three silvers (K1 team: 2011, 2019, 2021). She also won nine medals at the European Championships (5 golds and 4 bronzes).

Minařík Kudějová participated in two Olympic Games. She finished in 10th place in the K1 event at the 2016 Summer Olympics in Rio de Janeiro and 15th in the K1 event at the 2020 Summer Olympics in Tokyo after being eliminated in the semifinal.

World Cup individual podiums

1 Oceania Canoe Slalom Open counting for World Cup points

References

External links

Czech female canoeists
Living people
1990 births
Canoeists from Prague
Canoeists at the 2016 Summer Olympics
Olympic canoeists of the Czech Republic
Medalists at the ICF Canoe Slalom World Championships
Canoeists at the 2020 Summer Olympics